Hüseyin Cahit Ortaç (1908, Thessaloniki - 13 December 1980) was a Turkish politician.

He graduated from Faculty of Political Science, Ankara University.

He worked as a civil servant in Dalaman and Istanbul. He served as a district governor in Alucra, Sürmene, Kargı and Mustafakemalpaşa. Later, he served as a governor in Hakkari, Kırklareli and Bursa. Also, he was a member of Council of State (Turkey) and Senate of the Republic (Turkey).

References 

1980 deaths
1908 births
Members of the Senate of the Republic (Turkey)
Turkish politicians